The Nashville Predators (commonly referred to as the Preds) are a professional ice hockey team based in Nashville, Tennessee. The Predators compete in the National Hockey League (NHL) as a member of the Central Division in the Western Conference, and have played their home games at Bridgestone Arena since 1998. Their television broadcasting rights are held by Bally Sports South, and the Nashville Predators Radio Network flagship station is WPRT-FM. The Predators are currently affiliated with one minor league team: the Milwaukee Admirals of the American Hockey League (AHL).

The club was founded in 1997, when the NHL granted an expansion franchise to Craig Leipold, with the team beginning play in the 1998–99 season. After five seasons, the Predators qualified for their first Stanley Cup playoffs during the 2003–04 season. In 2008, ownership of the team was transferred from Leipold to a locally based ownership group. The Predators advanced to their first Stanley Cup Finals in 2017, but were defeated by the Pittsburgh Penguins in six games. In the following season, the Predators won their first Presidents' Trophy and Central Division title.

History

Bringing the NHL to Nashville
In late 1995, rumors began to circulate that the New Jersey Devils would relocate to the planned Nashville Arena. Nashville offered a $20 million relocation bonus to any team that would relocate, and the Devils attempted to terminate their lease with the NJSEA before ultimately restructuring it to stay in New Jersey.

After the failed attempt to land the Devils, NHL Commissioner Gary Bettman stated Nashville would probably be considered in upcoming expansion. The arena was opened in 1996, and after an attempt to bring the National Basketball Association's Sacramento Kings did not materialize, the city instead went after a hockey team.

In January 1997, a group led by Wisconsin businessman Craig Leipold made a formal presentation before the NHL requesting an expansion franchise. When Bettman and league officials visited Nashville to tour the arena, thousands gathered on the arena plaza to greet them. In June, the league granted conditional franchises to Nashville, Columbus, Ohio; Atlanta, and Minneapolis–Saint Paul.

The Nashville team would begin play in 1998 if they met the NHL requirement of selling 12,000 season tickets before March 31, 1998. Of the four cities, Nashville was the only one with a completed arena and therefore began play first. On July 9, 1997, Leipold named former Washington Capitals general manager David Poile as the franchise's first general manager. Portland Pirates' head coach Barry Trotz was named the franchise's first head coach on August 6.

On September 25, 1997, Leipold and team president Jack Diller held a press conference where they unveiled the franchise's new logo, a saber-toothed cat (Smilodon fatalis). The logo was a reference to a partial Smilodon skeleton found beneath downtown Nashville in 1971 during construction of the First American National Bank building, now the UBS Tower.

Once the logo was unveiled, the franchise held a vote among fans to choose a name. Three candidates were culled from 75: "Ice Tigers," "Fury" and "Attack." Leipold added his own submission to the vote, "Predators." On November 13, Leipold revealed at a press conference that his submission had won out and the new franchise would be known as the "Nashville Predators."

When awarded a franchise, the city of Nashville paid 31.50% of the $80 million fee to join the league. The city has engaged an affiliate of the team to operate the arena, and that agreement protects the city against annual arena operating losses over approximately $3.8 million. The $15 million payroll of the team was the lowest of the NHL.

Early years (1998–2005)
The Predators began play during the 1998–99 season, taking to the ice for the first time on October 10, 1998, where they lost 1–0 at home to the Florida Panthers. It was the only sold-out game of the Predators' first five bouts in Nashville. Three nights later, on October 13, they defeated the Carolina Hurricanes 3–2 for their first win. Forward Andrew Brunette scored the first goal. The Predators, in their first year of existence, finished second-to-last in the Western Conference with a 28–47–7 record. In the 1999–2000 season, the Predators finished with a similar record to the previous season, and finished last in the Western Conference behind the Calgary Flames. However, during a game versus the New York Islanders on February 20, 2000, the Predators scored four goals in 3 minutes and 38 seconds.

To begin the 2000–01 season, the Predators played two games at the Saitama Super Arena in Tokyo, Japan against the Pittsburgh Penguins. Each team won a game in front of the largest crowds ever to see a hockey game in Japan (13,849 for the first game and 13,426 for the second game). This included around 100 fans who made the trip from Tennessee.  Backed by the goaltending duo of Mike Dunham and Tomas Vokoun, Nashville finished the season in tenth place in the Western Conference, ten points out of a playoff spot with a total of 80 total points. During the 2001–02 season, the Predators recorded their 100th victory on December 6, 2001. With that win, Nashville became the second-fastest expansion team of the 1990s to reach the 100-win plateau. In the 2002–03 season, head coach Barry Trotz broke the record for most games coached by the original coach of an expansion team (392 games).

In June 2003, the Predators hosted the NHL Entry Draft. Future Predators captain Shea Weber was selected by the team with the 49th overall pick. 

The club failed to qualify for the Stanley Cup playoffs for their first five years as a franchise. However, in the 2003–04 season, the Predators finished eighth in the Western Conference, qualifying for their first postseason berth. The Predators were eliminated by the Detroit Red Wings in six games in the first round of the 2004 Stanley Cup playoffs. The following 2004–05 season was wiped out by a labor dispute between NHL owners and players.

After the lockout (2005–2014)
The Predators made their biggest free agent signing to that point in August 2005, when they signed Paul Kariya to a two-year, $9 million contract.

In the 2005–06 season, the Predators set an NHL record by winning their first four games by one goal each (although two of those were shootout victories, which would have been tie games in previous seasons). They also became only the fourth NHL franchise to start the season 8–0; the last time a team did so was the Toronto Maple Leafs, who set the mark with a 10–0 start in the 1993–94 season. The Predators set the franchise mark for wins in a season with a 2–0 shutout of the Phoenix Coyotes on March 16, 2006. In that match, Chris Mason became the ninth  goaltender to score a goal. By the end of the season, the Predators had accumulated 106 points—their first 100-point season—and clinched home-ice advantage in the first round of the playoffs for the first time in team history. They finished the season with an NHL-best 32–8–1 record at home. However, the Predators would be eliminated by the San Jose Sharks in five games in the first round of the 2006 playoffs.

During the off-season, the Predators acquired veteran center Jason Arnott from free agency on July 2, 2006. In the following season, Arnott and David Legwand led the team in goals with 27 each. Late in the season, the Predators traded two former first-round draft picks, Scottie Upshall and Ryan Parent, plus their first and third-round pick in the 2007 NHL Entry Draft, to the Philadelphia Flyers for five-time NHL All-Star Peter Forsberg. The Predators finished the season ranked fourth in the Western Conference with a franchise-record 110 points, finishing third overall behind the Buffalo Sabres and the Red Wings. They were defeated by the Sharks in the first round of the 2007 playoffs for the second year in a row, losing the series 4–1.

The roster saw a depletion in talent during the off-season. With multiple potential buyers and rumors of the franchise moving hounding the team until almost mid-season, the Predators were not expected to be successful during the 2007–08 season. Chris Mason, former backup goaltender to Tomas Vokoun (who was traded to the Florida Panthers) had a shaky season and shared net-minding duties with Dan Ellis. Ellis, who was signed from the Dallas Stars before the season began, had a 233:39 long shutout streak (fifth longest in league history) nearing the end of the season that helped Nashville attain the eighth playoff spot with 91 points. The Predators met the Presidents' Trophy-winning (and eventual Stanley Cup winners) Red Wings in the first round of the playoffs and were defeated 4–2, their fourth-straight first-round knockout.

New ownership group
The first off-season of settling in under new ownership was a quiet one for the Predators with little personnel movement. As such, the Predators began the 2008–09 season with little expectation. Following a strong push after the All-Star break and no movement at the trade deadline, the team found themselves still battling for a playoff spot into the last week of the season. Buoyed by the return of Steve Sullivan after almost two seasons recovering from a back injury, the Predators finished with 88 points, settling for tenth place in the Western Conference, missing the playoffs for the first time in five seasons.

The Predators made few major additions to their roster in the 2009 off-season, signing former San Jose Sharks forward Marcel Goc (who was extended for another year by the club in mid-season) and former Montreal Canadiens defenseman Francis Bouillon. The 2009–10 season also saw the much-anticipated debut of top prospect Colin Wilson. However, due to a groin injury suffered in training camp, Wilson spent the first week-and-a-half of the season on the sidelines, and was sent to the Milwaukee Admirals of the American Hockey League (AHL) in November. He returned to the club in February and scored 11 points in his next 15 games and finished the season with 15 points in 35 games. 2010 also saw a breakout year for the last pick in the 2005 Draft, Patric Hornqvist, as the 23-year-old Swede scored 30 in the 2009–10 season, becoming the fourth Predator to do so (the others being Steve Sullivan, Paul Kariya and Jason Arnott). The Predators qualified for the 2010 playoffs, facing the Chicago Blackhawks in the first round. The Predators earned their first postseason road win on April 16, 2010, when they beat the Blackhawks 4–1 at the United Center, although they lost the overall series in six games.

On July 9, 2010, the Predators announced defenseman Shea Weber would become the club's fifth captain. In the following years' playoffs, the Predators advanced to the second round of the playoffs for the first time in franchise history. They defeated the Anaheim Ducks in the first round, winning the fourth game of the series at Bridgestone Arena on April 24, 2011. Two days prior, Predators' goaltender Pekka Rinne was nominated as a Vezina Trophy finalist for his performance during the 2010–11 season. The Predators played against the number-one ranked team in the NHL in the second round, the Vancouver Canucks. The Predators lost the series 4–2.

On June 22, 2011, the Predators unveiled their modified logo set for the 2011–12 season. With the color scheme simplified to blue, gold, and white and eliminating orange, silver, and steel, the Predators cleaned up their primary logo and wordmark. A new alternate logo incorporating elements from a guitar pick and the Tennessee state flag was also introduced. Home jerseys changed from blue to gold. 

In the beginning of the 2011–12 season, on November 3, 2011, the Predators signed goaltender Pekka Rinne to a seven-year, $49 million deal. It was the largest contract awarded in Predators' history, as well as making Rinne the highest-paid goaltender in the NHL that year. On February 27, 2012, during the NHL's trade deadline, the Predators acquired Andrei Kostitsyn and Paul Gaustad from the Montreal Canadiens and the Buffalo Sabres, respectively. The Predators surrendered draft picks to bolster their team for the 2012 playoffs. The season also saw the return of Russian forward Alexander Radulov to the Predators after a four-year hiatus to play in the Kontinental Hockey League (KHL). For the second year in a row, and the second time in the team's history, the Predators won a first-round series in the Stanley Cup playoffs, defeating the Red Wings in a best-of-seven series 4–1. However, for the second year in a row, the Predators were ousted in the Western Conference second round, this time to the Phoenix Coyotes.

The following 2012–13 season as a result of the 2012–13 NHL lockout. The Predators failed to qualify for the playoffs in the shortened season, the first time they failed to do so since the 2008–09 season. After the season, the Predators signed Weber through a front-loaded $110 million, 14-year offer sheet, $68 million of it as a signing bonus, from the Philadelphia Flyers on July 19. The offer sheet was the richest in NHL history in terms of total money, money per season, and length, surpassing the previous offer sheet record set by Thomas Vanek.

The following season saw the departure of center David Legwand, the first player ever drafted by the Predators, the club's all-time leading scorer, and was co-leading scorer for the season at the time. Agreeing to waive his "no-trade clause", he was traded on March 5, 2014, to his hometown team, the Detroit Red Wings, in exchange for prospect forward Calle Jarnkrok, forward Patrick Eaves and a third-round pick in the upcoming 2014 NHL Entry Draft. After missing the playoffs for the second season in a row, the Predators opted not to renew the contract of Barry Trotz as their head coach after 15 years, although he was offered an unnamed position within the organization. On May 6, 2014, the Predators announced Peter Laviolette as their new head coach.

Peter Laviolette era (2014–2020)
In Peter Laviolette's first season as the Predators' head coach, the Predators finished second in the Central Division. Despite having home advantage in the first round of the 2015 playoffs, they lost the first round in six games to the Chicago Blackhawks, who went on to win the Stanley Cup. For the following 2015–16 season, the Predators name Sean Henry CEO and then finished as the Western Conference's first wild-card, earning 96 points. When they advanced to the second round after beating the Anaheim Ducks in Game 7, it was the franchise's first seven-game series and seven-game series win. They were eliminated in seven games by the San Jose Sharks, who went on to win the conference.

The Predators hosted the 2016 National Hockey League All-Star Game at Bridgestone Arena. 

In the 2016 off-season, on June 29, 2016, the Predators traded Weber to the Montreal Canadiens in exchange for defenseman P. K. Subban. The trade surprised many hockey fans because the details to this trade were kept strictly confidential until the deal was already made. On September 7, 2016, the Predators announced Mike Fisher would replace Weber as the sixth captain of the club.

First Stanley Cup Final Appearance
In the 2016–17 season, the Predators finished fourth in the Central Division with 94 points, which earned them the second wild-card spot in the Western Conference. The 2016–17 season marked the first time the Predators sold out all 41 regular season home games. Their eighth-place finish in the conference gave them a first-round Stanley Cup playoff matchup against the Chicago Blackhawks, who finished first in the conference during the regular season.

The Predators swept the Blackhawks in four games. This was the first time an eighth seed swept a playoff series against the top seed in the conference in NHL history as well as the first time that there had been a sweep by an eighth seed against a top seed in a best-of-seven playoff series in the history of North American major league professional sports. In the second round of the Stanley Cup playoffs, the Predators defeated the St. Louis Blues in six games, marking the first time the team advanced to the Western Conference Finals. On May 16, the Predators became the first team in 20 years (since the Detroit Red Wings in 1997) to achieve ten-straight wins at home in the postseason. On May 22, 2017, the Predators defeated the Anaheim Ducks 6–3 and won the series four games to two, winning the Western Conference, and advancing to the club's first Stanley Cup Finals. In the 2017 Stanley Cup Finals, the Predators went down 2–0 against the Penguins before battling back and leveling the series at two, winning games 3 and 4 at home. Returning to Pittsburgh, the Predators lost 6–0 before being eliminated at home 2–0 in game 6.

On April 5, 2018, the Predators clinched their first division title in team history while also claiming their first Presidents' Trophy. They defeated the Colorado Avalanche in the first round of the playoffs in six games, and then lost to the Winnipeg Jets in seven games in the second round. The next season saw the Predators clinch their second consecutive division title, but lost to the Dallas Stars in the First Round of the 2019 playoffs.

The Predators played in their first outdoor game at the 2020 NHL Winter Classic, facing the Dallas Stars at the Cotton Bowl. 

The Predators fired head coach Laviolette on January 6, 2020, with the team sitting at sixth place in the division at the time and a record of 19–15–7.

John Hynes era (2020–present)
On January 7, 2020, John Hynes was hired as the third head coach in the Predators' franchise history. In Hynes' first game as coach, Pekka Rinne became the second Predators goaltender to score a goal in a 5–2 win over the Chicago Blackhawks. The team's season would come to an abrupt end two months later when the league suspended operations due to the COVID-19 pandemic. The Predators advanced to the 2020 playoffs, but were defeated by the Arizona Coyotes in the qualifying round. The Predators returned to the playoffs in 2021, but were defeated by the Carolina Hurricanes in the First Round.

The Predators hosted the Tampa Bay Lightning at Nissan Stadium in their second outdoor game, the 2022 NHL Stadium Series, on February 26, 2022, losing 3-2 in front of a crowd of 68,619. They clinched the 2022 playoffs, but were swept by the eventual Stanley Cup champion Colorado Avalanche in the First Round.

In February 2023, David Poile announced that he would retire as general manager of the team at the end of the season. He will be succeeded by former Predators coach Barry Trotz.

Team information

Facilities

The Nashville Predators have played their home games at Bridgestone Arena since their inaugural season in 1998. Opened in 1996, Bridgestone Arena is a multi-purpose venue in downtown Nashville. The Predators' practice facility is located at Centennial Sportsplex, a multi-use athletic complex located next to Centennial Park. Both facilities are owned by the Metropolitan Government of Nashville and Davidson County.

Fan traditions
Fans of the Nashville Predators have modified the octopus-throwing tradition of Detroit Red Wings fans to show their support: on occasion, a fan will throw a catfish onto the ice. The Tennessean newspaper of Nashville cites the first instance of this as being on October 30, 2003. On May 16, 2017, during Game 3 of the Western Conference Final at Bridgestone Arena, country music singer, songwriter, and record producer Keith Urban, who had performed the National Anthem prior to the game, was seen on the Jumbotron hoisting a massive catfish that Tennessee Titans left tackle, Taylor Lewan had with him at the game. Lewan, along with fellow Titans offensive linemen Jack Conklin, Quinton Spain, Ben Jones, and Josh Klein, and Titans quarterback Marcus Mariota, served as the hype men prior to the game, another Predators playoff tradition prior to home games, which included them waving gold Predators towels, Mariota encouraging the crowd to get louder, Lewan hoisting the catfish, and the offensive linemen chugging beer.

Section 303 is where a section of fans at the Bridgestone Arena sit, stand, and cheer, colloquially known as The Cellblock. The group refers to themselves as "the loudest section of the loudest arena in the NHL." The fan-based organization has been recognized by the Predators' front office. A large banner was produced by the front office for posting on the wall behind the section.

On April 3, 2008, with the Predators clinging to a 3–2 lead with 4:30 in their final home game of the regular season, a sellout crowd at what was then known as the Sommet Center, gave the team a standing ovation through the entirety of the final TV timeout. The Predators went on to win the game against the St. Louis Blues and advanced to the playoffs that year, where the "standing O" during the final TV timeout has since become a fan tradition.

The mascot of the Predators is Gnash, a blue saber-toothed cat. Introduced in 1998, Gnash's trademark includes stunts, such as very fast rappels, zip lines, and a pendulum swing that takes him under the scoreboard and just inches off the ice. To go along with the saber-toothed cat mascot, Predators fans proudly use their Fang Fingers during each power play of the game. There are foam saber-fang gloves that can be purchased, but most fans simply curl their index and middle fingers on each hand into fang shapes and brandish them in an up-and-down motion. Fang Fingers are done to the horror sounds from the Alfred Hitchcock movie, Psycho.

Fans are also known for a variety of chants taunting players of the opposing team, particularly the goalie. For example, after each Predators goal, fans call the opposing goalie's name, accompanied by shouts of "It's all your fault" and other epithets. These cheers are sometimes said to originate from tradition at college football games, but some of these derive from traditions held by fans of Nashville's former pre-NHL hockey teams Nashville Dixie Flyers, Nashville South Stars, Nashville Knights, and Nashville Nighthawks/Nashville Ice Flyers. Nashville's fanbase is said by many to be among the loudest in the National Hockey League, with sound levels reaching over 120 dB during the playoffs. This has contributed to the team also being called "Smashville".

Jersey and logo

The original Predators uniforms were worn from 1998 to 2007 and both featured a silver yoke on the shoulder. Navy and white were the base uniform colors while gold was used only as an accent color. The white uniforms featured the primary Predators logo outside a navy triangle while the navy uniforms use the same logo minus the triangle. From 1998 to 2004 the secondary logo featuring the Gaylord Entertainment Center (now Bridgestone Arena) tower adorned the shoulders.

From 2001 to 2007 the Predators wore mustard gold third jerseys featuring the front-facing saber-toothed cat logo. These jerseys are known by the nickname "Mustard Cats." The logo then replaced the tower alternate logo on the shoulders of their primary uniforms in 2005.

Switching to Reebok's Edge template in 2007, the Predators made minor tweaks to their uniforms. Most notably, the white uniforms no longer featured a contrasting nameplate color, while the city name was added above the Predators logo.

From 2009 to 2011, the Predators wore navy third jerseys but with black replacing gold as trim color. A roundel logo featuring the fossilized cat adorned the shoulders while a checkerboard pattern of black and navy squares adorned the sleeves, tail stripes and socks.

For the 2011–12 season, the Nashville Predators changed their jersey design and color scheme. The home jerseys are a bright gold with navy and white highlights, while the away jerseys are white with gold and navy highlights. Furthermore, the Predators changed their logo, making it purely white, gold and navy. The jerseys have a guitar pick on the shoulder with the Tennessee state tri-star inside it, lines reminiscent of guitar strings on the numbers, and piano keys along the neckline inside the jersey as a nod to Nashville's internationally known music heritage. From the 2016–17 season gold helmets became a permanent part of the home uniform, after they first used them on Saturday home games the prior season.

In the 2017–18 season the Predators changed their uniform style to fit with the new Adidas template. While the gold home uniforms received minimal alterations, the away white uniforms featured more gold accents in the sleeves, shoulders and tail while navy was relegated to trim color.

The Predators unveiled a special edition uniform for the 2020 NHL Winter Classic, featuring a design inspired from the uniforms of the defunct EHL team Nashville Dixie Flyers. Heavy gold stripes with navy trim adorn the chest and sleeves while a script rendition of the team name was inserted to the gold chest stripe. A navy felt-rendered saber-toothed cat logo was also added on the left shoulder.

In the 2020–21 season, the Predators released a special "Reverse Retro" alternate uniform, using the design they wore from 1998 to 2007. However, gold was used as the base color while navy was relegated to trim color.

For the 2022 NHL Stadium Series, the Predators released a navy uniform with a thick gold stripe in front. The "Smashville" moniker in large navy letters along with the navy "guitar pick" alternate logo was emblazoned inside the gold stripe. Numbers were enlarged for visibility purposes.

A second "Reverse Retro" uniform was released in the 2022–23 season, using the 2001 to 2007 alternate uniform but with the current athletic gold in place of mustard gold.

Ownership
The franchise was initially owned by a group led by Craig Leipold. On May 23, 2007, Leipold was reported to have reached a tentative agreement to sell the team to Research in Motion chairman and co-CEO Jim Balsillie. At the time, Leipold indicated that the team would play the 2007–08 season in Nashville but that the future of the team after that was not clear.

On June 23, information leaked by several sources indicated that Leipold no longer wanted to sell the Predators to Balsillie. Subsequently, a campaign to land the team in Kansas City, Missouri, received a boost in late June 2007. The Canadian National Post, citing anonymous sources, reported that Leipold planned to sell the team to San Jose venture capitalist William "Boots" Del Biaggio III, who wanted to relocate the club to Kansas City's new Sprint Center for the 2008–09 season. Del Biaggio, who had a contract with Anschutz Entertainment Group to own an NHL club that would play home games in Sprint Center, had made an offer reported to be for about $190 million for the Predators. Del Biaggio had entered an agreement two years earlier, in 2005, to purchase the Pittsburgh Penguins, but the club backed out of the deal after it won that year's NHL draft lottery and took Sidney Crosby with the first overall pick.

On July 19, 2007, a group of local business owners known as Our Team Nashville held a rally at the Sommet Center to encourage fans to buy season tickets in order to help the Predators meet the attendance figures needed to keep the team in Nashville. They drew approximately 7,500 fans and sold the equivalent of 726 full-season tickets during the rally. The rally was heavily supported by George Plaster, then a sportscaster on WGFX 104.5 "The Zone" sports radio in Nashville. On August 1, 2007, the group released a letter of intent from Craig Leipold. After negotiations with the City of Nashville, the local group headed by David Freeman reached an agreement with Nashville Mayor Karl Dean, and the NHL Board of Governors approved the sale on November 29, 2007. The $172 million acquisition of the Nashville Predators included repayment of existing debt of approximately $61 million and $2.2 million in fees and expenses. The sale of the Predators to the Tennessee-based group included Del Biaggio, who had been trying to move the team to Kansas City. The locally based buyers held 73% of the team, while Del Biaggio and a minority partner acquired about 27% of the club.

In June 2008, Del Biaggio ran into legal trouble over a multitude of unpaid loans, culminating in his filing for Chapter 11 bankruptcy. Furthermore, it was alleged that Del Biaggio acquired the loans he used to buy his stake in the team through fraudulent means, prompting an FBI investigation and criminal charges. The charges culminated in a 97-month prison sentence for Del Biaggio. Under United States bankruptcy law, a trustee was appointed to sell Del Biaggio's assets, including his stake in the Predators, to pay off his creditors. In November 2011, it was announced that Calgary businessman W. Brett Wilson had purchased a 5% interest in the Nashville Predators.

On March 1, 2010, during the 2009–10 season, the Predators front office saw Freeman step down as chairman of the Nashville Predators in favor of Thomas Cigarran. On September 2, Cigarran announced that the local ownership group had completed the purchase of the Del Biaggio stake.

Ownership dispute
On June 23, 2016, Freeman filed a $250 million lawsuit against the Nashville Predators and Cigarran. His claim was that his ownership stake has been improperly diluted by Cigarran failing to notify him of capital calls, and that he had not received loan guaranty fees that the ownership group had agreed to pay him. The lawsuit stated that Freeman initially owned a 48% share, while the holding company for the Nashville Predators stated that Freeman controlled less than 1% of ownership in the team at the time of the suit. This dilution was exacerbated by the existence of two classes of investments in the Predators: the common units owned by Freeman were subject to capital calls; the Series A units originally owned by Del Biaggio and his minority partner were not subject to capital calls.

The dispute was sent to court-ordered arbitration on July 29, 2016, under the supervision of NHL commissioner Gary Bettman. As of January 25, 2018, arbitration was continuing in the unresolved dispute. The outcome may remain undisclosed, as the arbitration is private.

Bill Haslam purchases majority stake
On June 17, 2022, the Predators announced that former Governor of Tennessee Bill Haslam would purchase shares in the club and become majority owner over the course of several years. Haslam’s brother, Jimmy Haslam, is the owner of the Cleveland Browns and the Columbus Crew.

Season-by-season record
This is a partial list of the last five seasons completed by the Predators. For the full season-by-season history, see List of Nashville Predators seasons.

GP = Games played, W = Wins, L = Losses, T = Ties, OTL = Overtime Losses, Pts = Points, GF = Goals for, GA = Goals against

Players

Predators players have been active in the community with several different initiatives. These include efforts with the Make a Wish Foundation, 365 Pediatric Cancer Fund, and local youth hockey programs. Former player P.K. Subban is also known for starting the Blue Line Buddies program to help build relations between law enforcement and community members.

Current roster

Team captains

Tom Fitzgerald, 1998–2002
Greg Johnson, 2002–2006
Kimmo Timonen, 2006–2007
Jason Arnott, 2007–2010
Shea Weber, 2010–2016
Mike Fisher, 2016–2017
Roman Josi, 2017–present

First-round draft picks

Retired numbers

 The NHL retired Wayne Gretzky's No. 99 for all its member teams at the 2000 NHL All-Star Game.

Hall of Famers
 Peter Forsberg, C, 2007
 Paul Kariya, LW, 2005–2007

Franchise records

Scoring leaders

These are the top-ten point-scorers, goal scorers, and assist leaders in franchise regular season history. Figures are updated after each completed NHL regular season.

 – current Predators player

Note: Pos = Position; GP = Games played; G = Goals; A = Assists; Pts = Points; P/G = Points per game

Individual records

 Most games played: David Legwand, 956
 Most games played, goaltender: Pekka Rinne, 630
 Most goals in a season: Matt Duchene, 43 (2021–22)
 Most assists in a season: Roman Josi, 73 (2021–22)
 Most points in a season: Roman Josi, 96 (2021–22)
 Most penalty minutes in a season: Patrick Cote, 242 (1998–99)
 Most goals in a season, defenseman: Roman Josi, 23 (2021–22) and Shea Weber, 23 (2008–09 and 2013–14)
 Most points in a season, defenseman: Roman Josi, 96 (2021–22)
 Most goals in a season, rookie: Filip Forsberg, 26 (2014–15)
 Most points in a season, rookie: Filip Forsberg, 63 (2014–15)
 Most wins in a season: Pekka Rinne, 43 (2011–12)
 Most shutouts in a season: Pekka Rinne, 8 (2017–18)

Awards and trophies

League awards

Clarence S. Campbell Bowl
2016–17

Presidents' Trophy
2017–18

Lester Patrick Trophy
David Poile: 2000–01

Bill Masterton Memorial Trophy
Steve Sullivan: 2008–09

NHL Foundation Player Award
Mike Fisher: 2011–12

Mark Messier Leadership Award
Shea Weber: 2015–16
Wayne Simmonds: 2018–19

King Clancy Memorial Trophy
Pekka Rinne: 2020–21

Vezina Trophy
Pekka Rinne: 2017–18

James Norris Memorial Trophy
Roman Josi: 2019–20

All-Star honors

NHL first All-Star team
Shea Weber: 2010–11, 2011–12
Pekka Rinne: 2017–18
Roman Josi: 2019–20, 2021–22

NHL second All-Star team
Pekka Rinne: 2010–11
Shea Weber: 2013–14, 2014–15
P. K. Subban: 2017–18

NHL All-Rookie Team
Filip Forsberg: 2014–15
Juuse Saros: 2017–18
Alexandre Carrier: 2021–22

NHL All-Star Game selections
Sergei Krivokrasov: 1998–99
Kimmo Timonen: 1999–2000, 2003–04, 2006–07
Tomas Vokoun: 2003–04
Jason Arnott: 2007–08
Shea Weber: 2008–09, 2010–11, 2011–12, 2014–15, 2015–16
Ryan Suter: 2011–12
Pekka Rinne: 2014–15, 2015–16, 2017–18, 2018-19
Filip Forsberg: 2014–15
Roman Josi: 2015–16, 2018-19, 2019–20, 2021–22
James Neal: 2015–16
P. K. Subban: 2016–17, 2017–18
Juuse Saros: 2021–22, 2022–23

See also
 List of Nashville Predators broadcasters
 List of Nashville Predators general managers
 List of Nashville Predators head coaches
 Nashville Predators Radio Network

References

External links

 

 
National Hockey League teams
1998 establishments in Tennessee
Central Division (NHL)
Ice hockey clubs established in 1998
Ice hockey teams in Tennessee
National Hockey League in the Sun Belt
Sports in Nashville, Tennessee